Norman "Norm" Defelice (January 19, 1933 – September 27, 2015) was a Canadian ice hockey goaltender. He played 10 games for the Boston Bruins of the National Hockey League during the 1956–57 season. The rest of his career, which lasted from 1953 to 1970, was spent in various minor leagues. He became coach with Galt Hornets and Buffalo Blades in the 1970s before retiring from hockey.

Career statistics

Regular season and playoffs

References

External links
 

1933 births
2015 deaths
Boston Bruins players
Canadian expatriate ice hockey players in the United States
Canadian ice hockey goaltenders
Charlotte Clippers players
Clinton Comets players
Greensboro Generals (EHL) players
Hershey Bears players
Ice hockey people from Ontario
Jersey Devils players
Johnstown Jets players
Long Island Ducks (ice hockey) players
Ontario Hockey Association Senior A League (1890–1979) players
Sportspeople from Timmins
Springfield Indians players
St. Catharines Teepees players
Toledo Mercurys players
Trois-Rivières Lions (1955–1960) players
Washington Lions players
Washington Presidents players
Waterloo Hurricanes players